"Change Ur World" is the thirteenth single by Japanese boy band KAT-TUN. It was released on November 17, 2010 by their record label J-One Records. The title track was used as the 2nd theme song for the Nippon Television TV Show, Going! Sports & News, which is co-hosted by member Kazuya Kamenashi.

Chart performance
In its first week of its release, the single topped the Oricon singles chart, reportedly selling 230,829 copies. KAT-TUN gained their thirteenth consecutive number one single on the Oricon Weekly Singles Chart since their debut with all their singles sold more than 200,000 copies and continued to hold the second most consecutive number one singles since debut with fellow Johnny's group, NEWS.

By the end of the year, "Change Ur World" was reported by Oricon to sell 264,303 copies and was later certified Platinum by RIAJ denoting over 250,000 shipments.

Track listing

Sales and certifications

Plagiarism allegations

On November 30, 2010, independent artist AVTechNO! posted an entry on his blog expressing shock at the similarities between the first minute of KAT-TUN's track "Never×Over~「-」Is Your Part~" and his own work, "DYE", first released on February 1, 2010. Videos comparing the two works have been posted on video sharing sites such as YouTube and Nico Nico Douga, and have since gathered over a million views combined.

Never×Over~「-」Is Your Part~ is credited to a panel of composers who created member solo songs that had been released in the past. The song consists of old member solo songs put together in a new arrangement.

Lyrics: Koki Tanaka, Minori

Music: Hans Johnson, t-oga, NAO, ATSUSHI, Tatsuya Ueda, King of Slick, Magnus Funemyr

Arrangement: Hans Johnson

The breakdown of applicable sections
 T-oga (Kazuya Kamenashi solo "SWEET" composer)
 NAO (Taguchi Junnosuke solo "LOVE MUSIC" composer)
 ATSUSHI (Koki Tanaka solo "PIERROT" composer)
 Tatsuya Ueda (Tatsuya Ueda solo "RABBIT OR WOLF?" composer)
 King of Slick (Yuichi Nakamaru solo "FILM" composer)
 Magnus Funemyr (Yuichi Nakamaru solo "FILM" composer)

References

External links
 "Change Ur World" product information 

KAT-TUN songs
2010 singles
Oricon Weekly number-one singles
Billboard Japan Hot 100 number-one singles
2010 songs
Songs written by Wrethov
Songs involved in plagiarism controversies